Vienna, How it Cries and Laughs (German: Wien, wie es weint und lacht) is a 1926 German silent film directed by Rudolf Walther-Fein and Rudolf Dworsky and starring Fritz Greiner, John Mylong, and Mady Christians.

The film's art direction was by Jacek Rotmil.

Cast
 Fritz Greiner as Leopold Gruber - Haus / Fuhrwerksbesitzer 
 John Mylong as Martin - sein Sohn  
 Mady Christians as Sefi - seine Tochter  
 Frida Richard as Die Großmutter  
 Hans Brausewetter as Pepi Gschwandtner - ein Oberkellner  
 Erich Kaiser-Titz as General Albrecht v. Wagher 
 Mary Nolan as Adele - seine Tochter  
 Hermann Picha as Hofrat Anton Hutter  
 Werner Pittschau as Leutnant Otto Hutter - dessen Sohn  
 Julius Falkenstein as Rittmeister Graf Kollodat  
 Paul Biensfeldt as Schöllerer - Wagenwäscher  
 Max Menden  as Der Bursche des Generals  
 Wilhelm Diegelmann as Ein dicker Gast

References

Bibliography
 Bock, Hans-Michael & Bergfelder, Tim. The Concise Cinegraph: Encyclopaedia of German Cinema. Berghahn Books, 2009.

External links

1926 films
Films of the Weimar Republic
German silent feature films
Films based on works by Ludwig Anzengruber
Films directed by Rudolf Walther-Fein
Films directed by Rudolf Dworsky
Films set in Vienna
German black-and-white films